Nangwas is a village in Alwar district, which is at the Haryana border near Rewari.

Villages in Alwar district